Nanaimo Harbour Water Aerodrome  is a seaplane base (SPB) serving the city of Nanaimo, British Columbia, Canada. It is located in the Nanaimo Harbour, right downtown.

It is registered as an aerodrome, formerly classified as an airport, and an airport of entry by Nav Canada and is staffed by the Canada Border Services Agency (CBSA). CBSA officers at this airport can handle general aviation aircraft only, with no more than 15 passengers.

Airlines and destinations

See also
Nanaimo Airport
List of airports on Vancouver Island

References

Seaplane bases in British Columbia
Transport in Nanaimo
Registered aerodromes in British Columbia